"Glow" is an English language song by the Norwegian urban duo Madcon. It is the first single released from their fourth album Contraband. The song is produced by production team Element, and written by Element and Madcon. Madcon performed the song during the Eurovision Song Contest 2010 interval in Oslo, Norway.

Eurovision Song Contest 2010
The song was accompanied by flash mob dance arranged by Element at various locations, showing collective dancing by hundreds of ordinary people in various locations including at the Telenor Arena where the event was being held, as well as (in order of appearance) at L'Alfàs del Pi (Spain), Reykjavík (Iceland), Ljubljana (Slovenia), Gothenburg (Sweden), Vilnius (Lithuania), London (United Kingdom), Düsseldorf (Germany), Dublin (Ireland).

Additional celebration footage was shown (in their order of appearance) from Malta, Lithuania, Iceland, Azerbaijan, Sweden, Russia, France, Turkey, Poland, Estonia, Portugal, Switzerland, The Netherlands, Albania, Ireland, Slovenia, Serbia, Norway, Germany, Denmark, Armenia, Romania, Latvia, Belarus, United Kingdom, Croatia, Belgium, Georgia, Greece, Slovakia, Ukraine, Cyprus, live scenes from Hamburg (Germany), an individual in the North Sea (unidentified location), Moldova, Bulgaria, Bosnia and Herzegovina, Finland, Spain, Israel.

There was also special appearance footage by Crown Princess Mette-Marit, her daughter Princess Ingrid Alexandra and her son Marius Borg Høiby.

Track listing
Digital download
"Glow" – 3:50

German CD Single
"Glow" (Radio Edit) - 3:49
"Glow" (Extended Version) - 7:36

Chart performance
The song was released as a single making it to #1 in the Norwegian VG-lista singles chart for 10 consecutive weeks (weeks 23 to 32 / 2010). It also made it in many European singles charts: Germany (reaching #4), Finland (#6), Ireland (#12), Austria (#14), Denmark (#16), Sweden (#17), Spain (#34), Switzerland (#38), The Netherlands (#59) and UK (#70).

Charts

Year-end charts

Certifications

See also
 List of number-one hits in Norway in 2010

References

2010 singles
Number-one singles in Norway
2010 songs
Madcon songs
Songs written by Hitesh Ceon
Songs written by Kim Ofstad